In mathematics, a Severi variety is an algebraic variety in a Hilbert scheme that parametrizes curves in projective space with given degree and geometric genus and at most node singularities. Its dimension is 3d + g − 1.

It is a theorem that Severi varieties are algebraic varieties, i.e. it is irreducible.

References 
Maksym Fedorchuk, Severi varieties and the moduli space of curves, Ph.D. thesis, 2008.
Joe Harris and Ian Morrison. Moduli of curves, volume 187 of Graduate Texts in Mathematics. Springer-Verlag, New York, 1998.

Algebraic geometry
Scheme theory